The 2015 Wimbledon Championships was a Grand Slam tennis tournament which took place  at the All England Lawn Tennis and Croquet Club in Wimbledon, London, United Kingdom, from 29 June to 12 July 2015.

It was the 129th edition of the championships, the 48th in the Open Era and the third Grand Slam tournament of the year, played on grass courts and part of the ATP World Tour, the WTA Tour, the ITF Junior Tour and the NEC Tour. They were organised by the All England Lawn Tennis Club and the International Tennis Federation. The tournament was held one week later than in previous seasons, giving a three-week gap from the end of the 2015 French Open. The change, announced in 2012, is intended to provide players more time for recuperation and preparatory grass-court tournaments.

Novak Djokovic of Serbia won his third Wimbledon title in men's singles, defending his championship from 2014. Petra Kvitová of the Czech Republic was the defending champion in women's singles, but she lost to Jelena Janković in the third round.

Serena Williams won her sixth Wimbledon and 21st major title, defeating first-time finalist Garbiñe Muguruza in the final, 6–4, 6–4. She also achieved her second non-calendar year Grand Slam after winning the 2014 US Open, 2015 Australian Open and 2015 French Open.  With this win, Williams also became the oldest woman to win a Grand Slam singles title in the Open Era at 33 years and 289 days old, beating Martina Navratilova by 26 days, who won the 1990 Wimbledon Championships at 33 years and 263 days old.

Tournament 

The 2015 Wimbledon Championships was the 129th edition of the tournament and was held at All England Lawn Tennis and Croquet Club in London.

The tournament was an event run by the International Tennis Federation (ITF) and is part of the 2015 ATP World Tour and the 2015 WTA Tour calendars under the Grand Slam category. The tournament consisted of both men's and women's singles and doubles draws as well as a mixed doubles event. There were singles and doubles events for both boys and girls (players under 18), which were part of the Grade A category of tournaments, and doubles events for men's and women's wheelchair tennis players as part of the NEC tour under the Grand Slam category. The tournament was played on grass courts and took place over a series of 19 courts, including the four main showcourts, Centre Court, No. 1 Court, No. 2 Court and No. 3 Court.

Point and prize money distribution

Point distribution 
Below is a series of tables for each of the competitions showing the ranking points on offer for each event.

Senior points

Wheelchair points

Junior points

Prize money 

The Wimbledon total prize money for 2015 has been increased by 7% to £26.75m. The winners of the men's and women's singles titles will earn £1.88m, up £120,000 from the previous year. The figures for doubles events are per pair.

Singles players 
2015 Wimbledon Championships – Men's singles

2015 Wimbledon Championships – Women's singles

Day-by-day summaries

Singles seeds 
Seedings were announced on Wednesday, 24 June 2015.

Gentlemen's singles 
Seeds are adjusted on a surface-based system to reflect more accurately the individual player's grass court achievement as per the following formula, which applies to the top 32 players according to the ATP rankings on 22 June 2015:
 Take Entry System Position points at 22 June 2015.
 Add 100% points earned for all grass court tournaments in the past 12 months (16 June 2014 – 21 June 2015).
 Add 75% points earned for best grass court tournament in the 12 months before that (17 June 2013 – 15 June 2014).

Rank and points before in the following table are as of 29 June 2015.
Because the tournament takes place one week later than in 2014, points defending includes results from both the 2014 Wimbledon Championships and tournaments from the week of 7 July 2014 (Newport, Båstad and Stuttgart).

† The player did not qualify for the tournament in 2014. Accordingly, points for his 18th best result are deducted instead.

Ladies' singles 
Seeds are based on the WTA rankings as of 22 June 2015.  Rank and points before in the following table are as of 29 June 2015.
Because the tournament takes place one week later than in 2014, points defending includes results from both the 2014 Wimbledon Championships and tournaments from the week of 7 July 2014 (Bucharest and Bad Gastein).

Doubles seeds

Gentlemen's doubles 

 1 Rankings are as of 22 June 2015.

Ladies' doubles 

 1 Rankings are as of 22 June 2015.
 2 The Williams sisters were given a special seeding of 12, but they withdrew.

Mixed doubles 

 1 Rankings are as of 29 June 2015.

Main draw wild card entries 
The following players received wild cards into the main draw senior events.

Gentlemen's singles 
  Liam Broady
  Matthew Ebden
  Kyle Edmund
  Lleyton Hewitt
  Brydan Klein
  Denis Kudla
  Nicolas Mahut
  James Ward

Ladies' singles 
  Naomi Broady
  Johanna Konta
  Anett Kontaveit
  Jeļena Ostapenko
  Laura Robson

Gentlemen's doubles 
  Luke Bambridge /  Liam Broady
  Edward Corrie /  Kyle Edmund
  Matthew Ebden /  James Ward
  Lleyton Hewitt /  Thanasi Kokkinakis
  Jonathan Marray /  Frederik Nielsen
  Ken Skupski /  Neal Skupski

Ladies' doubles 
  Naomi Broady /  Emily Webley-Smith
  Johanna Konta /  Maria Sanchez
  Jocelyn Rae /  Anna Smith

Mixed doubles 
  Colin Fleming /  Jocelyn Rae
  Lleyton Hewitt /  Casey Dellacqua
  Jonathan Marray /  Anna Smith
  Ken Skupski /  Johanna Konta
  Neal Skupski /  Lisa Raymond

Main draw qualifier entries 
The qualifying competitions took place in Bank of England Sports Centre, Roehampton on 22 – 25 June 2015.

Gentlemen's singles 

  Vincent Millot
  Alejandro Falla
  Elias Ymer
  Hiroki Moriya
  Luke Saville
  Igor Sijsling
  Pierre-Hugues Herbert
  Yūichi Sugita
  Nikoloz Basilashvili
  John-Patrick Smith
  Michael Berrer
  Dustin Brown
  Aleksandr Nedovyesov
  Horacio Zeballos
  John Millman
  Kenny de Schepper

Lucky losers 
  Luca Vanni

Ladies' singles 

  Laura Siegemund
  Aliaksandra Sasnovich
  Xu Yifan
  Sachia Vickery
  Margarita Gasparyan
  Richèl Hogenkamp
  Olga Govortsova
  Duan Yingying
  Tamira Paszek
  Petra Cetkovská
  Bethanie Mattek-Sands
  Hsieh Su-wei

Gentlemen's doubles 

  Sergey Betov /  Alexander Bury
  Jonathan Erlich  /  Philipp Petzschner
  Mateusz Kowalczyk /  Igor Zelenay
  Fabrice Martin /  Purav Raja

Lucky losers 
  Marcus Daniell /  Marcelo Demoliner
  Gero Kretschmer /  Alexander Satschko

Ladies' doubles 

  Elizaveta Kulichkova /  Evgeniya Rodina
  Johanna Larsson /  Petra Martić
  Wang Yafan /  Zhang Kailin
  Magda Linette /  Mandy Minella

Lucky losers 
  Chan Chin-wei /  Nicole Melichar
  Misaki Doi /  Stephanie Vogt
  Jana Čepelová /  Stefanie Vögele

Protected ranking
The following players were accepted directly into the main draw using a protected ranking:

Men's Singles
  Nicolás Almagro (PR 26)
  Tommy Haas (PR 25)
  Florian Mayer (PR 34)
  Radek Štěpánek (PR 57)
  Janko Tipsarević (PR 39)

Women's Singles
  Edina Gallovits-Hall (PR 109)

Champions

Seniors

Gentlemen's singles 

  Novak Djokovic def.  Roger Federer, 7–6(7–1), 6–7(10–12), 6–4, 6–3

Prior to the finals, the two had faced off 39 times, with Federer having won the most matches, 20–19. At the time of the finals Djokovic was ranked No. 1 and Federer at No. 2. This encounter was their third meeting in a Grand Slam final, when the last two previous were split between the two at the 2007 US Open and 2014 Wimbledon Championships. Federer got the first break of serve in the match, during the first set, yet Djokovic quickly broke back leveling the match. When Djokovic was serving to remain in the first set, he had to fend off two set points from Federer, which he eventually got the set into a tiebreak, and it was a lopsided tiebreak that sent Djokovic up one set to none. The second set was a closely fought affair, but was decided to Federer's edge in the tiebreak. The last two sets were rather uneventful in the spectrum of the match because Djokovic got the breaks of serve, allowing him to win his third Wimbledon title, and second in a row. This put Djokovic eighth on the all-time list of Men's Grand Slam singles champions, and putting him fifth during the Open Era. He now possesses as many Wimbledon singles titles, as his coach Boris Becker won in his career.

Ladies' singles 

  Serena Williams def.  Garbiñe Muguruza, 6–4, 6–4

This was their first encounter in a Grand Slam final, whilst all of the past meetings, occurred in Grand Slam events, from the first-time playing each other at the 2013 Australian Open, that Serena Williams won the match in two sets, during this second round match. Their next contest occurred, at the 2014 French Open in the second round, yet this time around Garbiñe Muguruza, turned the tables to with the match in two sets. The third tie came, at the 2015 Australian Open, and it went three sets in a fourth round encounter, to the eventual victory by Serena in three sets. This bout would be their fourth meeting, and it got off to a rocky start by Serena, who served up three double faults, in order to get broken, during the first game of the match. Muguruza would get out to a four games to two advantage, when Williams held serve, and let out a "Come On". This rallied the twenty-time Grand Slam champion to win the first set, 6–4, when she broke the serve of Muguruza. Serena would get off to a fast start, during the second set, that she ended up getting breaks of serve from Muguruza in the fourth and sixth games of the set, to go up to a five games to one advantage. The momentous meaning the match held, for Williams ended up hitting her, when she had two bad service games, getting broken, letting Muguruza to come back to a five games to four set. This allowed Muguruza, the opportunity to serve in an attempt to stay in the match and set, yet she quickly got down in a love–40 hole, which she could not escape. The victory gave Serena her second "Serena Slam", and that was with the 2014 US Open win counted from the previous year. This victory was her twenty-first Grand Slam singles title, putting her one behind Steffi Graf in the Open Era of tennis, and three behind the all-time record held by Margaret Court. The win meant she became the oldest women's singles Grand Slam champion in the Open Era of tennis, besting the mark previously set by Martina Navratilova.

Gentlemen's doubles 

  Jean-Julien Rojer /  Horia Tecău def.  Jamie Murray /  John Peers, 7–5, 6–4, 6–4

Ladies' doubles 

  Martina Hingis /  Sania Mirza def.  Ekaterina Makarova /  Elena Vesnina, 5–7, 7–6(7–4), 7–5

Mixed doubles 

  Leander Paes /  Martina Hingis def.  Alexander Peya /  Tímea Babos, 6–1, 6–1

Juniors

Boys' singles 

  Reilly Opelka def.  Mikael Ymer, 7–6(7–5), 6–4

Girls' singles 

  Sofya Zhuk def.  Anna Blinkova, 7–5, 6–4

Boys' doubles 

  Lý Hoàng Nam /  Sumit Nagal def.  Reilly Opelka /  Akira Santillan, 7–6(7–4), 6–4

Girls' doubles 

  Dalma Gálfi /  Fanny Stollár def.  Vera Lapko /  Tereza Mihalíková, 6–3, 6–2

Invitation

Gentlemen's invitation doubles 

  Ivan Ljubičić /  Goran Ivanišević def.  Wayne Ferreira /  Sebastian Grosjean, 6−3, 1−6, [10−5]

Ladies' invitation doubles 

  Magdalena Maleeva /  Rennae Stubbs def.  Martina Navratilova /  Selima Sfar, 3–6, 7–5, [10–8]

Senior gentlemen's invitation doubles 

  Jacco Eltingh /  Paul Haarhuis def.  Guy Forget /  Cédric Pioline, 6–4, 6–4

Wheelchair

Wheelchair gentlemen's doubles 

  Gustavo Fernández /  Nicolas Peifer def.  Michael Jeremiasz /  Gordon Reid, 7–5, 5–7, 6–2

Wheelchair ladies' doubles 

  Yui Kamiji /  Jordanne Whiley def.  Jiske Griffioen /  Aniek van Koot, 6−2, 5−7, 6−3

Withdrawals 
The following players were accepted directly into the main tournament, but withdrew with injuries.

 Men's singles
 Before the tournament
  Julien Benneteau → replaced by  Filip Krajinović
  Juan Martín del Potro → replaced by  Marinko Matosevic
  David Ferrer → replaced by  Luca Vanni

During the tournament
  Kei Nishikori

 Women's singles
 Before the tournament
  Kateryna Kozlova → replaced by  Jana Čepelová
  Peng Shuai → replaced by  Edina Gallovits-Hall

Retirements

 Men's singles
  Andreas Haider-Maurer
  Denis Istomin

 Women's singles
  Karin Knapp
  Magda Linette

References

External links